Monday Blues is the second album by Japanese guitarist Kazumi Watanabe. The album was released on LP by RCA label of RVC Corporation in 1975.

Track listing

Personnel 
 Kazumi Watanabe – electric guitar
 Hidefumi Toki – alto & soprano saxophone
 Fumio Itabashi – piano
 Tutomu Okada – bass
 Motohiko Hino – drums

Production 
 Liner notes – Youzou Iwanami

Release history

References

External links 
 

1975 albums
Kazumi Watanabe albums